Matthew Lon Keough (July 3, 1955 – May 1, 2020) was an American professional baseball player. He played in Major League Baseball (MLB) as a right-handed pitcher from  through  for the Oakland Athletics (1977–1983), New York Yankees (1983–1984), St. Louis Cardinals (1985), Chicago Cubs (1986) and Houston Astros (1986). After his time in MLB, Keough pitched in Nippon Professional Baseball for the Hanshin Tigers for 4 seasons from 1987 through 1990. Keough batted and threw right-handed.

Career
Keough graduated from Corona del Mar High School in Newport Beach, California, in 1973. The Oakland Athletics selected Keough in seventh round of the 1973 Major League Baseball draft.

Keough was signed by Oakland as an infielder. He was supposed to replace departed Sal Bando at third base, but after leading the California league in hitting while playing for Modesto in his second year of professional baseball in 1975, he hit a disappointing .210 in Double-A in 1976. He was converted to a pitcher and joined Oakland a year later. He was selected to the All-Star Game in his rookie season for the  Athletics, recording a 3.24 ERA despite his 8–15 mark. In , he tied a major league record by losing his first 14 decisions and finished with a 2–17 record. His winning percentage of .105 was the worst recorded by a major league pitcher with 15 or more decisions since , when Philadelphia A's teammates Jack Nabors and Tom Sheehan finished the season with winning percentages of .048 and .059, respectively. From 1978–79, Keough made 28 consecutive starts without a victory, tying Cliff Curtis (1910–11) for the longest streak in MLB history according to the Elias Sports Bureau. The streak was later tied by Jo-Jo Reyes (2008–11).
 
In the  strike-shortened season he finished 10–6, helping Oakland to clinch the AL Division Series. He pitched well in a losing effort in Game Three of the AL Championship Series, giving up one earned run in  innings in a game won by the New York Yankees 4–0. 

Keough slumped again in 1982, tying for the AL lead with 18 losses against 11 wins in 34 starts. He also walked more batters than he struck out (101-to-75) and led the league in home runs (38) and earned runs (133) allowed. A number of baseball historians and statisticians have put this down to manager Billy Martin overworking Keough and the other members of the 1981 rotation. In 2006, Rob Neyer estimated that Keough threw 131 pitches per complete game in 1981, a heavy workload for a young pitcher even then.
 
In the 1983 mid-season, the Athletics traded Keough to the New York Yankees for Marshall Brant and Ben Callahan. Nursing a sore arm, he spent parts of two seasons in the minors and returned to the majors with the St. Louis Cardinals late in 1985. The next year, he divided his playing time between Triple-A, the Houston Astros and Chicago Cubs. In 1987 he joined the Hanshin Tigers of Nippon Professional Baseball and pitched for them until 1990. He attempted a comeback to the major leagues with the California Angels in 1991 spring training but did not make the roster. In March 1992, he tried again with the Angels and had made the major league roster, but while sitting in the dugout during an exhibition game in which he was later scheduled to pitch, he was hit in the right temple by a foul ball off the bat of San Francisco Giants' John Patterson, seriously injuring him and ending his playing career.

Following his playing career, Keough worked for the A's and Angels both as a roving pitching coach and as an executive from 1992 to 1999. After that, he scouted for the Tampa Bay Devil Rays and was again an executive for the Oakland Athletics.

Keough would occasionally throw a spitball. One time, however, his spitball backfired on him. Keough threw a spitball that Boston Red Sox second baseman Jerry Remy missed completely and had seemingly struck out. The umpire, seeing the tremendous break on the pitch, assumed Remy had fouled off the pitch and so he remained at bat with two strikes. On the next pitch, Remy hit a home run, the last of his career.

In a nine-season career, Keough posted a 58–84 record with 590 strikeouts and a 4.17 ERA in 1190 innings pitched, including seven shutouts and 57 complete games.

Personal life
Keough was the son of Marty Keough and the nephew of Joe Keough, both of whom also played in the majors. 

Keough was married to actress and November 1980 Playboy Playmate of the month, Jeana Tomasino in 1984 but they later separated. The two appeared on reality television on The Real Housewives of Orange County. The couple had three children: Shane, Kara and Colton. Shane, their oldest son, is a third-generation professional baseball player, making it as far as the Stockton Ports, a Class A affiliate of the Oakland Athletics, before being released in 2010. Daughter Kara married NFL player Kyle Bosworth.

Keough was sentenced to 180 days in jail in 2005 for driving under the influence, to another 180 days in jail in 2008 for violating his probation by drinking alcohol and to a year in jail in 2010 for driving under the influence.

Keough died on May 1, 2020, in California at the age of 64. His former wife Jeana revealed the cause of death was a pulmonary embolism.

See also

List of second-generation Major League Baseball players

References

External links
, or NPB (in Japanese)
Matt Keough at Baseball Biography

1955 births
2020 deaths
American expatriate baseball players in Japan
American League All-Stars
Anaheim Angels scouts
Baseball players from California
Burlington Bees players
California Angels scouts
Chattanooga Lookouts players
Chicago Cubs players
Hanshin Tigers players
Houston Astros players
Louisville Redbirds players
Major League Baseball pitchers
Minor league baseball managers
Modesto A's players
Nashville Sounds players
New York Yankees players
Oakland Athletics players
Oakland Athletics executives
Sportspeople from Pomona, California
St. Louis Cardinals players
Tampa Bay Devil Rays scouts
Tucson Toros players
American sportspeople convicted of crimes
Prisoners and detainees of California
Deaths from pulmonary embolism